Little Sister's Book and Art Emporium, also known as Little Sister's Bookstore, but usually called "Little Sister's", is an independent bookstore in the Davie Village/West End neighbourhood of Vancouver, British Columbia, Canada. The bookstore was opened in 1983 by Jim Deva and Bruce Smyth, and its current manager is Don Wilson.

The bookstore is famous for being embroiled in a legal battle with the Canada Border Services Agency over the importation of what the agency has labeled "obscene materials". These materials, nearly all dealing with male-male or female-female sexuality, were routinely seized at the border. The same publications, when destined for mainstream booksellers in the country, had often been delivered without delay or question. Glad Day Bookshop, an LGBT bookstore in Toronto, has faced similar difficulties.

Little Sister's filed their claim against the federal government in 1990, but the case stalled and was not heard until October 1994. The trial concluded in January 1996 with a judgment for the plaintiffs. The court found that Little Sister's shipments had been wrongly delayed or withheld due to the "systemic targeting of Little Sisters' importations in the Customs Mail Center."

In 2000, the case was heard in the Supreme Court of Canada. The court found that the customs has targeted shipments to the bookstore and attempted to prevent them from getting in. Consequently, the government was found to have violated section 2 of the Charter. However, the violation was justified under section 1. The case established that the onus of proving that expressive material is obscene lies with Canadian Customs.

The bookstore's travails were fictionalized as a subplot of the film Better Than Chocolate. A feature-length documentary film by Aerlyn Weissman, Little Sister's vs. Big Brother (2002), has also been released about the bookstore. Former manager Janine Fuller was also a coauthor with Stuart Blackley of the book Restricted Entry: Censorship on Trial, a non-fiction account of the Little Sister's battle, and wrote an introduction for Forbidden Passages: Writings Banned in Canada, an anthology of excerpts from some of the impounded works which was edited by Patrick Califia. Both books were published in 1995, and were awarded Lammys at the 8th Lambda Literary Awards ceremony in 1996. Additionally, the book What right?: Graphic interpretations against censorship addressed the court case in the form of a graphic novel, with proceed from sales of the book being donated to the Little Sister's Defense fund to assist with legal challenges with Canada Customs. The book features contributions from a number of comic artists including Alison Bechdel and Marc Bell.

The bookstore's co-owner, Jim Deva, died on September 21, 2014, at age 64. On December 23, 2019, Bruce Smyth, co-founder of Little Sister's, died at St. John Hospice at age 66.

See also
Little Sisters Book and Art Emporium v. Canada (Minister of Justice), [2000] 2 S.C.R. 1120
Spartacus Books, another bookstore in Vancouver with a wide "queer lit" section
Feminist bookstore
Gay's the Word (bookshop)

Notes

External links

Independent bookstores of Canada
LGBT culture in Vancouver
LGBT bookstores
Censorship in Canada
Canadian companies established in 1983
Retail companies established in 1983
1983 establishments in British Columbia
Shops in Vancouver
LGBT organizations in Canada
LGBT history in Canada
LGBT literature in Canada
West End, Vancouver